Mount Bray is a rounded mountain that is ice-capped but has a steep, bare rock southeast face, situated east of Jenkins Heights and  northwest of Klimov Bluff on the Walgreen Coast, Marie Byrd Land. It was mapped by the United States Geological Survey (USGS) from surveys and from U.S. Navy air photos, 1959–66, and named by the Advisory Committee on Antarctic Names after Thomas K. Bray, a USGS topographic engineer with the Marie Byrd Land Survey party, 1966–67.

References 

Mountains of Marie Byrd Land